The First Legislative Assembly of the Wisconsin Territory convened from , to , and from , to , in regular session.

The first session was held at Belmont, Iowa County (in present-day Lafayette County, Wisconsin).  The 2nd session and special session were held at Burlington, Des Moines County (in present-day Des Moines County, Iowa).

The three sessions of the 1st Legislative Assembly were the only legislative sessions to take place before the division of the Iowa Territory from the Wisconsin Territory.

Major events
 April 30, 1836: Henry Dodge was appointed the first Governor of the Wisconsin Territory.
 October 10, 1836: George Wallace Jones elected delegate to the United States House of Representatives from Wisconsin Territory's at-large congressional district.
 December 1836: Henry S. Baird appointed the first Attorney General for the Wisconsin Territory.
 January 26, 1837: Michigan was admitted to the United States as the 26th state.
 February 6, 1837: William B. Slaughter appointed the 2nd Secretary of the Wisconsin Territory.
 March 4, 1837: Inauguration of Martin Van Buren as the 8th President of the United States.
 May 10, 1837: The Panic of 1837 began in New York City.
 June 20, 1837: Queen Victoria acceded to the throne of the United Kingdom of Great Britain and Ireland upon the death of King William IV at Windsor Castle.  
 June 27, 1837: The first edition of the Milwaukee Sentinel was published in Milwaukee.
 November 7, 1837: Abolitionist Elijah Parish Lovejoy was killed by a pro-slavery mob in Alton, Illinois.
 June 12, 1838: President Martin Van Buren signed legislation creating the Iowa Territory from the part of the Wisconsin Territory west of the Mississippi River.  The division became effective July 4, 1838.
 June 28, 1838: The coronation of Queen Victoria took place at Westminster Abbey.
 September 1838: James Duane Doty elected delegate to the United States House of Representatives from Wisconsin Territory's at-large congressional district.
 October 3, 1838: The Sauk leader Black Hawk died in the Iowa Territory.

Major legislation
 November 2, 1836: The Council concurs on adoption of the first great seal of the territory
 December 3, 1836: An Act to establish the seat of government of the territory of Wisconsin, and to provide for the erection of public buildings, 1836 Wis. Terr. Act 11.  Established Madison as the capital city of Wisconsin.
 December 7, 1836: An Act to divide the counties of Brown and Milwaukee, 1836 Wis. Terr. Act 28.  Created the counties of Calumet, Dane, Dodge, Fond du Lac, Jefferson, Manitowoc, Marquette, Portage, Racine, and Washington.
 December 8, 1836: An Act to divide the county of Iowa, 1836 Wis. Terr. Act 31.  Created the counties of Grant and Green.
 January 12, 1838: An Act to abolish imprisonment for debt, and other purposes, 1837 Wis. Terr. Act 37. 
 January 17, 1838: An Act relating to the militia, and public defense of the territory of Wisconsin, 1838 Wisc. Terr. Act 58. 
 January 17, 1838: An Act to incorporate the borough of Green Bay, 1838 Wisc. Terr. Act 66.
 June 23, 1838: An Act to district the territory of Wisconsin into electoral districts and to apportion the representation of each, 1838 Wisc. Terr. Special Session Act 18.

Sessions
 1st session: October 25, 1836December 9, 1836
 2nd session: November 6, 1837January 20, 1838
 Special session: June 11, 1838June 25, 1838

Leadership

Council President
 Henry S. Baird (W) - during the 1st session
 Arthur B. Ingram - during the 2nd and special sessions

Speaker of the House of Representatives
 Peter H. Engle (D) - during the 1st session
 Isaac Leffler (W) - during the 2nd session
 William B. Sheldon (D) - during the special session

Members

Members of the Council

Members of the House of Representatives

Employees

Council employees
 Secretary: 
 Edward McSherry, 1st session
 George Beatty, 2nd & special sessions
 Sergeant-at-Arms:
 William Henry, 1st session
 Levi Sterling, 2nd session
 George W. Harris, special session

House employees
 Chief Clerk: 
 Warren Lewis, 1st session
 John Catlin, 2nd & special sessions
 Sergeant-at-Arms:
 Jesse M. Harrison, 1st session
 William Morgan, 2nd & special sessions

Notes

References

External links
 Wisconsin Legislature website

1836 in Wisconsin Territory
1837 in Wisconsin Territory
1838 in Wisconsin Territory
1838 in Wisconsin
1838 in Iowa
Wisconsin
Wisconsin
Wisconsin
Wisconsin legislative sessions